Single Ig IL-1-related receptor (SIGIRR), also called Toll/Interleukin-1 receptor 8 (TIR8) or Interleukin-1 receptor 8 (IL-1R8), is transmembrane protein encoded by gene SIGIRR, which modulate inflammation, immune response, and tumorigenesis of colonic epithelial cells.

Gene 
Human gene SIGIRR is localized on chromosome 11. It is composed of 10 exons spanning about 11 700 base pairs. In mouse, this gene is on chromosome 7, where it is composed of 9 exons spanning about 9 400 base pairs.

Structure 
SIGIRR is 410 amino acids long protein. In contrast with other members of IL-1 receptor family it has got only 1 immunoglobulin (Ig) domain in its N terminal extracellular part instead of 3 Ig domains. After this domain, there is a transmembrane domain, which is anchored to the plasmatic membrane. It has got TIR domain and 95 amino acids long C terminal tail in the intracellular part, which is not present in other  IL-1 receptor family members. Structure of the TIR domain is different in the case of SIGIRR. In its tertiary structure SIGIRR lacks amino acids Ser447 and Tyr536, which are important for IL-1R1 signalization. Instead of these amino acids SIGIRR contains Cys222 and Leu305. The functional importance of these differences is not known so far. Human and mouse SIGIRR protein sequences are 82%, identical and they are overall 23% identical with IL-1R1. SIGIRR is extensively glycosylated on its extracellular domain, and loss of this modification impairs its function.

Expression 
SIGIRR is expressed in several epithelial tissues, particularly in epithelial cells of kidneys, digestive tract, liver, lungs, and in lymphoid organs. It is also expressed in monocytes, B lymphocytes, T lymphocytes, dendritic cells, and NK cells. In general, its expression is downregulated during inflammation or infection. Its reduced expression was also found in patients with chronic lymphoid leukemia, or in cells from colonic cancer. In human cells from colonic cancer, there was observed an increased expression of one variant of SIGIRR. This variant lacks its exon 8, is not glycosylated and its function is impaired. It also inhibits glycosylation of Wild type variant a its transport to plasmatic membrane.

One of the discovered transcription factor, which regulates the expression of SIGIRR, is SP1. It binds to the proximal part of the promoter of the SIGIRR gene and induce its transcription. Binding of SP1 on SIGIRR promoter is inhibited by the activation of p38 MAP kinase, which is activated through the TLR4 signalization. Treatment of mice with a small amount of lipopolysaccharide, which is a ligand of TLR4, causes reduction in SIGIRR expression.

Function 
SIGIRR negatively regulates the activation of the IL-1R1, IL18R1, IL-1R5/ST2, TLR4, TLR7, TLR3, TLR9, and TLR1/2 and inhibits activation of transcription factor NF-κB and JNK MAP kinase.

SIGIRR interacts with IL-1R1 when it binds IL-1. N terminal extracellular immunoglobulin domain associates with IL-1R1 and blocks its heterodimerization with IL-1RAP. In addition, C terminal TIR domain of SIGIRR binds downstream elements of IL-1R1 signalization and prevents the constitution of the functional signalling complex. Deletion of these domains disrupts the regulation activity of SIGIRR. SIGIRR uses a slightly different mechanism to regulate the activity of TLR4. It also binds to receptor complex around TLR4. TIR domain of SIGIRR is crucial for interaction with TLR4, and it also interacts with downstream elements of the TLR4 pathway. In contrast, the extracellular immunoglobulin domain of SIGIRR is dispensable for the inhibition of TLR4 signalling. There are 2 mechanisms, which are proposed for explanation of this inhibition of the TLR4 pathway. First is that SIGIRR blocks the formation of signalling complex at activated TLR4 and the second is that SIGIRR prevents translocation of this signalization complex into a cytosol. SIGIRR inhibits signal transduction by its interaction with TLRs, IL-1R1 and downstream signalling proteins, and in this manner, it participates in negative regulation of inflammation. SIGIRR also prevents homodimerization of MYD88, and it also prevents signalization through adaptor protein TRIF, which is used, for example, by TLR3.

Negative regulation of IL-1R pathway by SIGIRR has its effect on the differentiation of Th17 lymphocytes. IL-1 supports differentiation for Th17 lymphocytes and expression of transcription factors RORγt and IRF4. Treatment by this cytokine also activates mTOR kinase and promotes the proliferation of Th17 lymphocytes. SIGIRR-deficient T lymphocytes lack this negative regulation, and it favours mTOR-dependent differentiation and proliferation of Th17 lymphocytes. SIGIRR also negatively regulates TLRs, IL-1R pathway, and following mTOR activation in intestinal epithelial cells. Ligands for TLRs in the intestine are mainly components of intestinal microflora. Its deficiency or expression of mutated form in these cells leads to the signalization, which promotes inflammation, proliferation and increases incidence of tumors and its size.

SIGIRR as a coreceptor of IL-1R5 for IL-37 binding 
SIGIRR takes part in mediating the anti-inflammatory IL-37 signalization. It interacts with IL-37, IL-18R1 and forms tripartite signaling complex. Activity of this complex transduce anti-inflammatory signal and is essential for manifestation of IL-37 activity. Upon this signalization it causes inhibition of components of NF-κB pathway, kinases mTOR, TAK1, FYN, p38, JNK, ERK and it also causes activation of phosphatase PTEN, kinase MER, transcription factor STAT3 and adaptor protein p62 (DOK1). Pre-treatment of mice by IL-37 before injection of lipopolysaccharide reduced examined levels of pro-inflammatory cytokines and, also reduced their weight loss and hypothermia. This protective effect of IL-37 was abolished by deletion of SIGIRR, reduction of its expression or neutralization of IL-37 by antibodies.

In addition to the regulation of inflammation, IL-37 also affects metabolism. Stimulation of skeletal muscle cells by IL-37 increases level of AMP-dependent kinase, increases its activation and induces metabolic reprogramming. It causes increase of oxidative phosphorylation, Krebs cycle, nucleotide and amino acids metabolism, and decrease of inflammatory mediators levels. This response does not occur in case of SIGIRR deficiency

References

Further reading